"Fugly", a blend of the words "fucking" and "ugly", is a slang term for extreme unattractiveness.

Fugly may also refer to:

Film and TV
Fugly, a 2007 film directed by Todd Holland
 Fugly!, a 2014 film directed by Alfredo De Villa
 Fugly (film), a 2014 Hindi language film

Other

 Fugly Awards, the former name of the Pug Awards, an architecture award for Toronto buildings

See also